The diagonal formula can refer to:
some geometric method see Polygon entry
The formula developed by Aumann and Shapley to construct a Shapley value for non atomic games with a continuum of players